The Ubaye is a river of southeastern France.

Its rises at the Col de Longet, in the Cottian Alps on the border with Italy. It flows generally southwest, through Saint-Paul-sur-Ubaye, Jausiers and Barcelonnette. It flows into the Lac de Serre-Ponçon (which is fed and drained by the Durance) near La Bréole.

See also
 Ubaye Valley
 Mercantour National Park

References

Rivers of France
Rivers of Alpes-de-Haute-Provence
Rivers of Provence-Alpes-Côte d'Azur
Rivers of the Alps